Gorgoniceps is a genus of fungi in the family Helotiaceae. The genus contains 6 species.

Species:
 Gorgoniceps aridula
 Gorgoniceps hylocomnii

References

Helotiaceae